Valeriana pauciflora, commonly called the  largeflower valerian,  is a plant species in the Caprifoliaceae. It is native to the Eastern United States, where it is found in the regions of the Interior Low Plateau, the Ohio River drainage, and the Potomac River Valley. In this region, it is found in very nutrient-rich, mesic forest communities, often in stream valleys or lower slopes.

Valeriana pauciflora is a conservative perennial restricted to high-quality habitat. It produces white through light pink flowers in late spring and early summer.  This species can set seeds without insect pollination, and also might be cross-pollinated by butterflies 

The specific epithet pauciflora, is Latin for 'few flowered'.

References

pauciflora
Flora of the Eastern United States